Adashevo is the name of several rural localities in Russia:
Adashevo, Republic of Mordovia, a selo in Adashevsky Selsoviet of Kadoshkinsky District in the Republic of Mordovia; 
Adashevo, Nizhny Novgorod Oblast, a selo in Chernovskoy Selsoviet of Bolsheboldinsky District in Nizhny Novgorod Oblast; 
Adashevo, Tula Oblast, a village in Studenetsky Rural Okrug of Venyovsky District in Tula Oblast